Ecgberht I may refer to:

 Ecgberht I of Kent (died 673)
 Ecgberht I of Northumbria (died 873)

See also
 Ekbert I (died 1068), Margrave